The Dukovany Nuclear Power Station is a nuclear power plant near Dukovany in the Czech Republic.

It was the second nuclear power plant in Czechoslovakia (the Bohunice Nuclear Power Plant in what is now Slovakia was constructed in 1958), and the first one in what is now the Czech Republic. In 1970 Czechoslovakia and the Soviet Union ratified a contract for construction of two nuclear power plants. Actual construction work began four years later. From 1985 to 1987, four power units with pressurized water reactors were commissioned. All four are still in operation.

Dukovany nuclear power plant supplies approximately 14 TWh of electric energy annually to the national power network. The plant is owned and operated by ČEZ Group. The power plant modernisation will successively be carried out to the end of its planned service life.

Plant characteristics
The plant has four reactors. As of 31 December 2011 ČEZ reported turbine generator output (gross capacity) as listed below. Net capacity is a baseline estimate only.

In 2005, Unit 3 was upgraded to 456 MWe gross capacity, and the same upgrade was made to Unit 1 and Unit 4 in 2007. Unit 3 was further upgraded in 2009 to 500MWe. In total an extra 240 MWe of capacity has been or will be added before 2013 in a comprehensive program of improvements including steam plant replacement, addition of instrumentation and fuel changes.

The reactors are fuelled by uranium dioxide UO2. Fuel is placed in the reactor in 312 fuel assemblies. Each assembly consists of 126 fuel rods with a hermetically sealed fuel.

Dukovany Nuclear Power Station has 8 cooling towers, each 125 metres tall.
In 1994, a visitor information centre was opened at the site.

West of the facility there is a 136 metre tall guyed tower for monitoring air radioactivity.

In 2023, ČEZ planned to invest more than CZK2.3 billion ($105 million) mainly to ensure "safe and reliable operation until at least 2047" with a lifetime of at least 60 years. The units are also switching to a 16-month fuel replacement cycle from the current 12-month cycle.

Power distribution
The power lines leaving Dukovany Nuclear Power Station are mainly installed on delta type pylons. They run to Slavetice substation situated at 49°6'15" N and 16°7'10" E. At this substation the powerline to Dürnrohr in Austria starts.

Plant owner ČEZ plans to install a district heating circuit to supply heat to homes and businesses in Brno. A pipeline over 40 kilometres in length could be installed after regional officials have considered ČEZ's environmental impact statement for the project, submitted in July 2010.

Replacement
In 2019 the Czech government gave preliminary approval for at least one new nuclear power unit for about 2035 to replace the four units expected to shut down between 2035 and 2037. The financial model proposed is a state guarantee so finance can be obtained at government interest rates, but no subsidy on operating costs or above market-price electricity rates. In January 2021 Chinese companies were excluded from bidding for political and security reasons, following advice from the security services of EU and NATO member states. In April 2021, it was announced that Russia's Rosatom would be excluded as well, after it has been alleged that two Russian agents were perpetrators of the 2014 Vrbětice ammunition warehouses explosions.

Popular culture
The Dukovany reactor complex appears in the video game Tom Clancy's EndWar as a potential battlefield.

See also

Nuclear power in the Czech Republic
Energy in the Czech Republic
Temelín Nuclear Power Station - another nuclear power plant in the Czech Republic
Dalešice Reservoir - nearby reservoir that supplies cooling water and the Dalešice Hydro Power Plant

References

External links
Profile at International Nuclear Safety Program website
Official pages of ČEZ

Energy infrastructure completed in 1985
Energy infrastructure completed in 1987
Nuclear power stations in the Czech Republic
Třebíč District
Czechoslovakia–Soviet Union relations
Nuclear power stations using VVER reactors
Buildings and structures in the Vysočina Region
1985 establishments in Czechoslovakia
20th-century architecture in the Czech Republic